Woodinville High School is a public secondary school located in Woodinville, Washington, a suburb northeast of Seattle. A senior high school serving grades 9 through 12, it educates the eastern portion of the Northshore School District and is a member of the KingCo 4A athletic conference.

Basic information
Woodinville High School was built in 1983 on a  site. A special education and administration addition in 1990 expanded the facility. From 2009 to 2012, the school underwent demolition and reconstruction for a new school building, to which a new addition includes a theater. The school theater, gym, and fields are used in the evenings and on weekends for special events. Leota Middle School and Timbercrest Middle School feed into Woodinville High School.

WHS is one of four general high schools in the Northshore School District as of summer of 2020. The four schools are Woodinville High School, Bothell High School, North Creek High School, and Inglemoor High School. The school offers a large selection of AP classes. Woodinville High supports athletic teams, including football, basketball (boys'/girls'), baseball, softball, soccer (boys'/girls'), track and field, cross country, tennis (boys'/girls'), girls' gymnastics, and wrestling.

Academics
WHS offers AP Classes, NEVAC classes, and WANIC (Washington Network for Innovative Careers) classes, such as nursing. Languages offered are Spanish, French, American Sign Language (ASL), Japanese, and German. Art classes offered include metal design (jewelry), photography, stained glass, and ceramics. Computer classes include CAD, AP Computer Science, advanced programming topics, and computer animation.  AP classes offered are: English language and composition, English literature, biology, chemistry, computer science, physics 1, physics 2, environmental science, world history, modern European history, art history, U.S. history, U.S. government and politics, psychology, economics (micro and macro), calculus AB, calculus BC, statistics, Spanish, French, German, Japanese, and studio art.

Extracurricular activities

Drama program
The drama program has been invited twice to perform at the Edinburgh Fringe as part of the American High School Theatre Festival.

Music program
The WHS music courses include wind ensemble, symphonic band, percussion ensemble, orchestra, jazz band, guitar, choir, and piano lab. Together the wind ensemble, symphonic and percussion ensemble combine to become the marching band or pep band. The music department's largest concert is "An Evening at the Pops," held in May. Performances in this concert include those by the orchestra, band, choir, and jazz band.

The WHS choir program includes baritone, tenor, alto, and soprano parts. There is also an advanced women's choir for a full class period throughout the day, and an advanced mixed choir at the end of the day.

The high school also offers an EWI choir.

The Woodinville High School music programs were one of four high school music programs in the country to be accepted to play at the WorldStrides National Instrumental Music Festival at Carnegie Hall in New York City, NY in February 2019.

Athletics
The WHS athletic department consists of 19 women's team sports across 3 sports seasons and 16 men's team sports across 3 sports seasons.

Notable alumni
Ryan Couture, MMA fighter, class of 2000
Christian Niccum, former Olympic athlete who competed in the luge.
Jake Snider, lead vocalist and guitarist of Minus the Bear, class of 1994
Matt Tuiasosopo, MLB, class of 2004
Marques Tuiasosopo, NFL quarterback, Pac-10 Offensive Player of the Year (2000 season) & 2001 Rose Bowl MVP for the University of Washington Huskies football team, class of 1997
Leslie Gabriel (Tuiasosopo), University of Washington Volleyball Coach, class of 1995
Duke Welker, MLB, class of 2004
Andre Dillard, Offensive tackle for the Philadelphia Eagles.

References

External links

Greatschools.net: Woodinville High School

High schools in King County, Washington
Educational institutions established in 1983
Public high schools in Washington (state)
1983 establishments in Washington (state)
Schools in Woodinville, Washington